Kevin James Comer (born August 1, 1992) is an American former professional baseball pitcher.

Career
Comer is a native of Shamong Township, New Jersey, and attended Seneca High School in Tabernacle Township, New Jersey.

Toronto Blue Jays
The Toronto Blue Jays selected him in the first round, with the 57th overall selection, of the 2011 MLB draft. He signed with the Blue Jays, receiving a $1.65 million signing bonus agreed to ten minutes before the signing deadline, rather than enroll at Vanderbilt University. He made his professional debut that season with the Bluefield Blue Jays of the Rookie-level Appalachian League.

Houston Astros
On August 16, 2012, the Blue Jays traded Comer as the player to be named later in the deal completed on July 20 that sent Francisco Cordero, Ben Francisco, Asher Wojciechowski, Joe Musgrove, David Rollins, and Carlos Pérez to the Houston Astros, in exchange for J. A. Happ, Brandon Lyon, and David Carpenter. Houston assigned him to the Greeneville Astros of the Rookie-level Appalachian League and he finished the season there. In 49.1 total innings pitched between Bluefield and Greeneville, he was 3–4 with a 4.56 ERA. In 2013, he pitched for the Tri-City ValleyCats of the Class A New York-Penn League where he was 2–5 with a 4.93 ERA in 15 games (seven starts), and in 2014, he played with the Quad Cities River Bandits of the Class A Midwest League where he compiled a 2–5 record and 4.24 ERA in 21 games (11 starts).

Comer spent the 2015 season with Quad Cities and Lancaster JetHawks of the Class A-Advanced California League, transitioning into a relief pitcher during the season. In 30 games (14 being starts), he was 7–5 with a 4.46 ERA. After the 2015 season, he played winter baseball for the Adelaide Bite of the Australian Baseball League to gain more experience as a reliever. In 2016 he played for Lancaster and the Corpus Christi Hooks of the Class AA Texas League. In 29 relief appearances between both teams he was 2–2 with a 4.09 ERA. He played for the Fresno Grizzlies of the Class AAA Pacific Coast League in 2017, going 5–4 with a 3.68 ERA in 43 relief appearances.

Detroit Tigers
Comer signed a minor league contract with Detroit Tigers during the offseason. He was assigned to the Toledo Mud Hens of the Class AAA International League but became a free agent after the season.

Minnesota Twins
On January 28, 2019, Comer signed a minor league contract with the Minnesota Twins. He was released on March 27, 2019.

Sugar Land Skeeters
On April 15, 2019, Comer signed with the Sugar Land Skeeters of the Atlantic League of Professional Baseball. He became a free agent following the season.

References

External links

1992 births
Living people
People from Shamong Township, New Jersey
Sportspeople from Burlington County, New Jersey
Baseball players from New Jersey
Baseball pitchers
Bluefield Blue Jays players
Greeneville Astros players
Tri-City ValleyCats players
Quad Cities River Bandits players
Lancaster JetHawks players
Adelaide Bite players
Corpus Christi Hooks players
Fresno Grizzlies players
Toledo Mud Hens players
Sugar Land Skeeters players
American expatriate baseball players in Australia